Frank J. Aguilar is a politician currently serving as the member of the Cook County Board of Commissioners from the 16th district. Currently Democrat, he previously was a member of the Republican Party, under which he served as a member of the Illinois House of Representatives representing the 24th district from 2002 to 2004.

Career
Aguilar served as a Republican member of the Illinois House of Representatives representing the 24th district from 2002 to 2004, becoming the only Hispanic American of his party in the General Assembly. Aguilar was defeated in 2004 by Democrat Michelle Chavez in a race that was thought to be non-competitive. It has been alleged that Aguilar had originally asked Chavez, a friend, to run for his office as a "ghost candidate," so that he would have an easy reelection race. Chavez unexpectedly beat Aguilar in the general election.

Aguilar later served as an elected member of the Morton College Board of Trustees.

On April 16, 2020, now a Democrat, he was appointed to the Cook County Board of Commissioners to succeed Jeff Tobolski.

Personal life
His brother, John Aguilar, is also active in Republican politics the northern Illinois area, and has served as an Township Trustee in Aurora Township, Illinois.

Electoral history 
2002 General election
Frank Aguilar (R) 53.59%
Elizabeth "Lisa" Hernandez (D) 46.41%
2004 General election
Michelle Chavez (D) 53.24%
Frank Aguiar (R) 46.76%

References

Illinois Republicans
Members of the Illinois House of Representatives
Living people
Hispanic and Latino American state legislators in Illinois
Year of birth missing (living people)
Illinois Democrats
Latino conservatism in the United States